The discography of Aqua, a Danish-Norwegian dance-pop group, contains three studio albums, two compilation albums, three remix albums and 21 singles.

Albums

Studio albums

Compilation albums

Remix albums

Singles

Other charted songs

Video albums

Music videos

1990s

2000s

2010s

References

Discographies of Danish artists
Discographies of Norwegian artists
Discography
Pop music group discographies